Samuel Dunn may refer to:
 Samuel Orace Dunn (1877–1958), American transportation specialist
 Samuel Dunn (minister) (1798–1882), Free Church Methodist minister and religious journalist
 Samuel Dunn (mathematician) (died 1794), English mathematician
 Sam Dunn (born 1974), Canadian musician and film maker
 Sam Dunn (rugby league), rugby league player